James Francis Reilly II (born March 18, 1954) is an American geologist, retired NASA astronaut, and honorary United States Marshal who served as the 17th Director of the United States Geological Survey from 2018 to 2021. He flew on three Space Shuttle missions: STS-89, STS-104 and STS-117.

Early life and education
Reilly was born at Mountain Home Air Force Base, Idaho. He graduated from Lake Highlands High School, Dallas, Texas, in 1972. He has three degrees from the University of Texas at Dallas, a bachelor of science degree in geosciences in 1977, a master of science degree in geosciences in 1987 and a doctorate in geosciences in 1995.

Career
In graduate school, Reilly was selected to participate in the 1977–1978 scientific expedition to Marie Byrd Land, West Antarctica, as a research scientist specializing in stable isotope geochronology. In 1979, he started work as an exploration geologist with Santa Fe Minerals Inc., in Dallas, Texas. From 1980 to the time he was selected for the astronaut program, Reilly was employed as an oil and gas exploration geologist for Enserch Exploration Inc., in Dallas, Texas, rising to the position of Chief Geologist of the Offshore Region. At the same time, he was involved in applying new imaging technology for industrial applications in deep water engineering projects and biological research. Reilly spent approximately 22 days in deep submergence vehicles operated by Harbor Branch Oceanographic Institution and the U.S. Navy.

NASA selected Reilly for the astronaut program in December 1994. He reported to the Johnson Space Center in March 1995 and completed a year of training and evaluation, and qualified for flight assignment as a mission specialist. Initially, he was assigned to work technical issues for the Astronaut Office Computer Support Branch. Reilly flew on STS-89 in 1998 and STS-104 in 2001. He has logged over 517 hours in space, including three spacewalks totaling 16 hours and 30 minutes. He has worked both on the ISS and Mir space stations. Reilly was next assigned as the Astronaut Office lead on Shuttle training. In 2007 was a member of the crew of STS-117. Concurrent with his crew assignment he is designated as Payloads and Procedures Operations lead for the Astronaut Office ISS Branch.

From January 2010 to May 2014, Reilly worked as the American Public University System's Dean of the School of Science and Technology.

In January 2018, U.S. President Donald Trump nominated Reilly to be the director of the U.S. Geological Survey. The U.S. Senate confirmed him in April 2018.

After leaving government service in 2020, Reilly later joined defense contractor Booz Allen Hamilton the following year as an executive adviser.

Organizations
Officer in the U.S. Navy Reserve. Member, American Association of Petroleum Geologists, Naval Reserve Association, Tailhook Association, Reserve Officers Association, Association of Space Explorers.

Special honors
Antarctic Service Medal, 1978. US Navy ROTC scholarship, 1972. Seventh Honorary U.S. Marshal, 2001.

Criticism

After James Reilly was appointed by President Trump to lead the U.S. Geological Survey he then instructed his office to abandon the traditional practice of using climate models that stretch to the end of the century and instead to only use climate models projecting the impact of climate change through 2040. 

His statements on the National Climate Assessment focused on scientific uncertainties rather than directly stating concurrence with opinions expressed by some scientists.

References

External links

 Spacefacts biography of James F. Reilly

1954 births
Living people
University of Texas at Dallas alumni
American astronauts
United States Geological Survey personnel
United States Navy officers
People from Mesquite, Texas
People from Mountain Home, Idaho
Trump administration personnel
United States Navy reservists
Space Shuttle program astronauts
Spacewalkers
Mir crew members